The Greyhound Bus Station at 219 N. Lamar St., Jackson, Mississippi, was the site of many arrests during the May 1961 Freedom Rides of the Civil Rights Movement.  The Art Deco building has been preserved and currently functions as an architect's office.

Construction
In 1937, Greyhound Lines contracted for a new bus station in Jackson, Mississippi.  Incorporating a streamlined style and vertical, illuminated "Greyhound" marquee, it is unique for its structural glass exterior. When operating as a bus station, the building included a coffeeshop and bathing facilities. Sources differ on whether the station is the work of W.S. Arrasmith or George Mahan Jr. and Nowland Van Powell of Memphis, Tennessee.

Freedom Ride to Jackson, Mississippi
Freedom Riders were civil rights activists who rode interstate buses into the segregated southern United States, in 1961 and subsequent years, to challenge the non-enforcement of the United States Supreme Court decisions which had ruled segregated public buses to be unconstitutional.

Jackson, Mississippi was planned as a stop on the Freedom Rides of May 1961. On May 28 that year, nine Freedom Riders arrived at the Greyhound Bus Station. Other groups had arrived four days earlier. Upon arrival, riders would seek access to facilities denied to non-whites, such as waiting areas designated "Whites Only." During the next four months, 329 people were arrested in the town, half of them black and half of them white, with a quarter being women. Part of the Freedom Riders' strategy was to overwhelm Jackson city jails by refusing bail. When Jackson's jails were full of riders arrested at Trailways and Greyhound facilities, Freedom Riders were transferred to Parchman penitentiary.

Preservation

Located within the southeast boundary of the Farish Street Neighborhood Historic District, the building was acquired by architect Robert Parker Adams in 1988 whose firm restored the station's exterior and interior. The state of Mississippi has placed an explanatory marker on the site.

See also
 Farish Street Neighborhood Historic District, Jackson, Mississippi

References

External links
 Greyhound Bus Station - Mississippi Freedom Trail in the Historical Marker Database
 Tour of restored building, by Robert Parker Adams, Architect
 Mississippi Freedom Trail
 Mississippi Historic Markers
 Google Map of Farish Street Neighborhood Historic District
 Photo of historic plaque

Civil rights protests in the United States
Bus stations in Mississippi
African-American history of Mississippi
Greyhound Lines
National Register of Historic Places in Jackson, Mississippi
Civil rights movement
Bus stations on the National Register of Historic Places
Transportation buildings and structures on the National Register of Historic Places in Mississippi
1938 establishments in Mississippi
Transportation in Hinds County, Mississippi